Robert Carlsson (born July 2, 1974 in Uppsala, Sweden) is a retired ice hockey forward who played eleven seasons for the Timrå IK, the last eight of them in the Swedish Elitserien league.

Playing career 
As a junior player, Carlsson began playing for his hometown club Uppsala AIS during the 1992-93 season. The team, later known as Almtuna IS, was struggling in the third/second-level league Division 1 and rarely qualified for play in the second-level Allsvenskan (which still was the spring part of the league at the time). He stayed with the club for six seasons.

After having failed at the NHL drafts, in 1997 Robert moved to the slightly more promising Timrå IK of a neighbouring division in the same league. The struggle continued at first, but at the end of his third season with the team Carlsson helped Timrå win promotion to Elitserien in 2000.

On December 6, 2005 Robert Carlsson set the new club record of total games played with 452 in a game against Färjestads BK. The following season he also became the first player to reach 500 games with Timrå IK, which happened on January 27, 2007 while facing Skellefteå AIK.

Aged 33, Robert announced his retirement on March 7, 2008 at the end of his eleventh season with Timrå IK.

External links

References 

 
 
  

1974 births
Almtuna IS players
Living people
Swedish ice hockey centres
Timrå IK players
Sportspeople from Uppsala